James Miller (born 10 May 1889) was an English professional footballer who played as an outside right in the Football League for a number of clubs.

Personal life 
Miller served in the Tyne Electrical Engineers during the First World War.

Career statistics

Honours 
Swansea Town

 Football League Third Division South: 1924–25

References

1889 births
Sportspeople from Tynemouth
Footballers from Tyne and Wear
English footballers
South Shields Albion F.C. players
Wallsend F.C. players
Newcastle United F.C. players
Grimsby Town F.C. players
Everton F.C. players
Coventry City F.C. players
Preston North End F.C. players
Pontypridd F.C. players
Darlington F.C. players
Chesterfield F.C. players
AFC Bournemouth players
Swansea City A.F.C. players
Luton Town F.C. players
English Football League players
Year of death missing
Association football outside forwards
British Army personnel of World War I
Tyne Electrical Engineers soldiers